Taylor Mokate is an American professional rugby player who was formerly contracted to play for the USA Sevens during 2012.

Originally recruited as a tight end to play at the University of Oklahoma, Mokate ended playing on the rugby team. Mokate signed to play for Old Boys University an amateur club based in New Zealand to compete for  The Jubilee Cup during the 2012 season.

On June 9, 2012 Mokate earned his first cap for the USA in a 25-28 loss to Canada. Mokate scored his first international try in a victory against Georgia. In July 2012 Mokate signed a contract to play professionally for the USA Sevens, but that contract was not renewed for 2013.

References

1988 births
Living people
American rugby union players
United States international rugby union players
United States international rugby sevens players